Ernő Márkus (born 15 April 1890, date of death unknown) was a Hungarian wrestler. He competed in the lightweight event at the 1912 Summer Olympics.

References

External links
 

1890 births
Year of death missing
Olympic wrestlers of Hungary
Wrestlers at the 1912 Summer Olympics
Hungarian male sport wrestlers
Martial artists from Budapest
20th-century Hungarian people